The Sabine Shoe is the name of the bronze shoe trophy that was awarded to the winner of the annual college football game between the Louisiana Ragin' Cajuns (formerly the Southwestern Louisiana Bulldogs) of the University of Louisiana at Lafayette (formerly the University of Southwestern Louisiana) in Lafayette, Louisiana and the Lamar Cardinals of Lamar University in Beaumont, Texas. The Sabine Shoe trophy was first awarded in 1968 by the University of Southwestern Louisiana's chapter of Alpha Phi Omega fraternity. The name of the bronze rivalry trophy was derived from the Sabine River that forms part of the Texas–Louisiana border. USL defeated Lamar in the 1978 edition of the rivalry game, but the Ragin' Cajuns were not awarded the trophy as it had vanished. The Sabine Shoe trophy now sits in at trophy case in the Ragin' Cajun Athletic Complex in Lafayette.

The two teams have met 34 times on the field, with the Ragin' Cajuns currently holding a 22–11 edge in the series. The game has been played infrequently following the Ragin' Cajuns departure from the Southland Conference after the 1981 season. In 1982, the conference was one of several forced to reclassify from NCAA's Division I-A—now known as the NCAA Division I Football Bowl Subdivision (FBS)—to Division I-AA—now known as the Football Championship Subdivision (FBS).  The Ragin' Cajuns, met the NCAA requirements to remain a Division I-A member and chose to continue participation in that subdivision. Lamar remains a member of the FCS.

Game results

See also  
 List of NCAA college football rivalry games

Notes

References

College football rivalry trophies in the United States
Louisiana Ragin' Cajuns football
Lamar Cardinals football